Mats Wilander defeated the three-time defending champion Ivan Lendl in a rematch of the previous year's final, 6–4, 4–6, 6–3, 5–7, 6–4 to win the men's singles tennis title at the 1988 US Open. It was the longest US Open men's singles final in history, lasting 4 hours and 54 minutes. With the win, Wilander gained the world No. 1 ranking for the first time, replacing Lendl.

This was the first major in which future 14-time major champion Pete Sampras and future four-time major champion Jim Courier competed in the main draw.

Seeds
The seeded players are listed below. Mats Wilander is the champion; others show the round in which they were eliminated.

  Ivan Lendl (finalist)
  Mats Wilander (champion)
  Stefan Edberg (fourth round)
  Andre Agassi (semifinalist)
  Boris Becker (second round)
  Jimmy Connors (quarterfinalist)
  Yannick Noah (second round)
  Miloslav Mečíř (third round)
  Tim Mayotte (third round)
  Henri Leconte (third round)
  Brad Gilbert (second round)
  Guillermo Pérez Roldán (third round)
  Jonas Svensson (second round)
  Andrés Gómez (third round)
  Anders Järryd (third round)
  John McEnroe (second round)

Draw

Finals

Top half

Section 1

Section 2

Section 3

Section 4

Bottom half

Section 5

Section 6

Section 7

Section 8

References

External links
 Association of Tennis Professionals (ATP) – 1988 US Open Men's Singles draw
1988 US Open – Men's draws and results at the International Tennis Federation

Men's singles
US Open (tennis) by year – Men's singles